

Alpheus Thomas Mason (September 18, 1899October 31, 1989) was an American legal scholar and biographer. He wrote several biographies of justices of the Supreme Court of the United States, including Louis Brandeis, Harlan F. Stone, and William Howard Taft.

Alpheus Thomas Mason was born on September 18, 1899, in Snow Hill, Maryland. He graduated from Dickinson College with an AB in 1920 and an AM and PhD from Princeton University in 1921 and 1923, respectively. At Princeton, he grew close with Edward Samuel Corwin, who "became [his] mentor and also his benefactor and friend".

Mason was on the Duke University faculty for two years after receiving his PhD. In 1925, he came back to Princeton where he remained until his retirement in 1968. At Princeton, he held the McCormick chair and was named the McCormick Professor of Jurisprudence when he retired. He continued teaching at other colleges and universities until 1980.

He died on October 31, 1989, at his home in Princeton, New Jersey.

Publications 
 Organized Labor and the Law (1925)
 Brandeis: Lawyer and Judge in the Modern State (1933)
 Bureaucracy Convicts Itself: The Ballinger-Pinchot Controversy of 1910 (1941)
 The Brandeis Way (1938)
 Brandeis: A Free Man's Life (1946)
 Security through Freedom: American Political Thought and Practice (1955)
 Harlan Fiske Stone: Pillar of the Law (1956)
 The Supreme Court from Taft to Warren (1958)
 In Quest of Freedom: American Political Thought and Practice (1959)
 The Supreme Court: Palladium of Freedom (1962)
 The States Rights Debate: Antifederalism and the Constitution (1964)
 William Howard Taft: Chief Justice (1964)

Citations

Works cited

Further reading 
 

1899 births
1989 deaths
20th-century American academics
20th-century American biographers
20th-century American male writers
Dickinson College alumni
People from Princeton, New Jersey
People from Snow Hill, Maryland
Princeton University alumni
Princeton University faculty